There is also a Bishop and Diocese of Umuahia in the Church of Nigeria Province of Aba.

The Roman Catholic Diocese of Umuahia is a diocese located in the city of Umuahia. It was part of the Old Ecclesiastical Province of Onitsha, but presently, it belongs to the Ecclesiastical province of Owerri, in Nigeria, which was erected on March 26, 1994 .

History
 June 23, 1958: Established as Diocese of Umuahia from the Diocese of Owerri. In 1981 and 1990, two younger dioceses - Okigwe and Aba, respectively- were carved out of the old Umuahia diocese. The fiftieth anniversary of the creation of the Diocese was celebrated in glamour on June 23, 2008.

Special churches
The Cathedral is Mater Dei Cathedral in Umuahia. This elegant edifice which has helped to beautify the ancient city of Umuahia was dedicated on December 8, 2000.

Bishops
 Bishops of Umuahia (Roman rite)
 Bishop Anthony Gogo Nwedo, C.S.Sp. (February 19, 1959 – April 2, 1990)
 Bishop Lucius Iwejuru Ugorji (April 2, 1990 – March 6, 2022)

Auxiliary Bishop
Michael Kalu Ukpong (2020-

Other priests of this diocese who became bishops
Anthony Ekezia Ilonu, appointed Bishop of Okigwe in 1981
Fortunatus Nwachukwu (priest here, 1984-1990), appointed nuncio and titular archbishop in 2012
Gregory Obinna Ochiagha, appointed Bishop of Orlu in 1980
Mark Onwuha Unegbu, appointed Bishop of Owerri in 1970

See also
Roman Catholicism in Nigeria

Sources
 GCatholic.org
 Catholic Hierarchy

Roman Catholic dioceses in Nigeria
Christian organizations established in 1958
Roman Catholic dioceses and prelatures established in the 20th century
1958 establishments in Nigeria
Roman Catholic Ecclesiastical Province of Owerri